Runnin' Wild is the debut album by the Australian hard rock band Airbourne. It was released on 23 June 2007 via EMI and debuted on the Australian ARIA album chart at number 21. It debuted at number 62 on the UK album chart. It was released in the United States on 29 January 2008 through Roadrunner Records and debuted at number 106 on the Billboard 200 chart.

Runnin' Wild won "Best Debut" at the Metal Hammer Golden Gods Awards 2008. As of 27 October 2009, the album has sold upwards of 250,000 worldwide.

The album artwork features the front gate of HM Prison Pentridge.

Track listing

Limited edition 
In addition to the standard bonus tracks above, the limited edition version, containing a bonus DVD with eight live tracks from the band's appearance at the 2008 Wacken Open Air Festival, as well as music videos for the album's three singles. The bonus tracks include two new songs entitled "Heads are Gonna Roll" and "Red Dress Woman", and remakes of three songs from their 2004 EP Ready to Rock.

Personnel 
Airbourne
Joel O'Keeffe – lead vocals, lead guitar
David Roads – rhythm guitar, backing vocals
Justin Street – bass, backing vocals
Ryan O'Keeffe – drums

Production
Bob Marlette – producer
Dave Schiffman – engineer
Sid Riggs – assistant engineer
Andy Wallace, John O'Mahony – mixing
Jan Petrov, Mike Scielzi, Paul Suarez – mixing assistants
Ted Jensen – mastering at Sterling Sound, New York City

In popular culture 

 The song "Runnin' Wild" is featured in the video games The Crew 2, Madden NFL 08, NASCAR 09, and NHL 09. It was also featured in a commercial for the video game Battlefield: Bad Company and as downloadable content for Rock Band and Rock Band 2. The song is also used in ESPN Saturday Night College Football highlights. The song is also used in Season 5, Episode 10 "Head of the Snake" of Cobra Kai as Johnny Lawrence defends himself against four of Cobra Kai's Instructors at Terry Silver's house. 
 The song "Blackjack" is featured in the video games Need for Speed: ProStreet and NFL Tour.
 The song "Stand Up for Rock 'N' Roll" is featured in NHL 08, the trailer Maximum FirePower for Medal of Honor: Airborne, Madden NFL 09, Bring It On: In It to Win It and in NASCAR 08. The song was also the theme for WWE's Royal Rumble 2008 and the 2009 AHL All-Star Game.
 The song "Let's Ride" is featured in skateboarding video game Skate, in the 2008 film College, and in the teen movie Sex Drive.
 The song "Too Much, Too Young, Too Fast" is featured in Burnout Paradise and is the official theme of NASCAR 09. It is also featured in the video game Guitar Hero World Tour, in the trailer for the film I Love You, Beth Cooper, and appears in the films The Lost Boys: The Tribe and Thunderstruck.
 The song "Girls in Black" is featured in the skateboarding video game Tony Hawk's Proving Ground and the racing game Need for Speed: Undercover.
 The song "Diamond in the Rough" is constantly used during the NRL games on Friday nights and Sunday afternoons when transitioning to commercial breaks. It is also featured in the film She's Out of My League''.

Charts

Sales certifications

Release history

References

External links 

2007 debut albums
Airbourne (band) albums
Roadrunner Records albums
Albums produced by Bob Marlette
Albums recorded at A&M Studios